Abgar V (c. 1st century BC – c. AD 50), called Ukkāmā (meaning "the Black" in Syriac and other dialects of Aramaic), was the King of Osroene with his capital at Edessa.

Background 

Abgar was described as "king of the Arabs" by Tacitus, a near-contemporary source. Moses of Chorene depicted Abgar as an Armenian, but modern scholarly consensus agree that the Abgarids were in fact an Arab dynasty.

Armenian historian Moses of Chorene (ca. 410–490s AD) notes that Abgar V's chief wife was Queen Helena of Adiabene, who according to Josephus was the wife of King Monobaz I of Adiabene.

Letter of Abgar to Jesus 

Abgar V is said to be one of the first Christian kings in history, having been converted to the faith by Thaddeus of Edessa, one of the seventy disciples.

The church historian Eusebius recorded that the Edessan archives contained a copy of a correspondence exchanged between Abgar of Edessa and Jesus. The correspondence consisted of Abgar's letter and the answer dictated by Jesus. On 15 August 944, the Church of St. Mary of Blachernae in Constantinople received the letter and the Mandylion. Both relics were then moved to the Church of the Virgin of the Pharos.

This account enjoyed great popularity in the East and in the West during the Middle Ages.  Jesus' letter was copied on parchment, inscribed in marble and metal, and used as a talisman or an amulet. Of this correspondence, there survives not only a Syriac text, but an Armenian translation as well, two independent Greek versions, shorter than the Syriac, and several inscriptions on stone.

Scholars have disputed many aspects of this account such as whether Abgar suffered from gout or from leprosy, or whether the correspondence was on parchment or papyrus.

The text of the letter was:

Jesus gave the messenger the reply to return to Abgar:

Egeria wrote of the letter in her account of her pilgrimage in Edessa. She read the letter during her stay, and remarked that the copy in Edessa was fuller than the copies in her home (which was likely France).

In addition to the importance it attained in the apocryphal cycle, the correspondence of King Abgar also gained a place in liturgy for some time. The Syriac liturgies commemorate the correspondence of Abgar during Lent. The Celtic liturgy appears to have attached importance to it; the Liber Hymnorum, a manuscript preserved at Trinity College, Dublin (E. 4, 2), gives two collects on the lines of the letter to Abgar. It is even possible that this letter, followed by various prayers, may have formed a minor liturgical office in some Catholic churches.

This event has played an important part in the self-definition of several Eastern churches. Abgar is counted as  saint, with feasts on 11 May and 28 October in the Eastern Orthodox Church, Thursday of the Third Week of Lent (Mid-Lent) in the Syriac Orthodox Church, and daily in the Mass of the Armenian Apostolic Church. 

The Armenian Apostolic Church in Scottsdale, Arizona, is named after Saint Abgar (also spelled as Apkar).

Critical scholarship 

A number of contemporary scholars have suggested origins of the tradition of Abgar's conversion apart from historical record. S. K. Ross suggests the story of Abgar is in the genre of a genealogical myth which traces the origin of a community back to a mythical or divine ancestor. F. C. Burkitt argues that the conversion of Edessa at the time of Abgar VIII was retrojected upon the Apostolic age. William Adler suggests the origin of the story of the conversion of Abgar V was an invention of an antiquarian researcher employed by Abgar VIII, who had recently converted to Christianity, in an effort to securely root Christianity in the history of the city. Walter Bauer, on the other hand, argued the legend was written without sources to reinforce group cohesiveness, orthodoxy, and apostolic succession against heretical schismatics. However, several distinct sources, known to have not been in contact with one another, claimed to have seen the letters in the archives, so his claim is suspect.

Significant advances in scholarship on the topic have been made including Desreumaux's translation with commentary, M. Illert's collection of textual witnesses to the legend, and detailed studies of the ideology of the sources by Brock, Griffith and  Mirkovic. The majority of scholars now claim the goal of the authors and editors of texts regarding the conversion of Abgar were not so much concerned with historical reconstruction of the Christianisation of Edessa as the relationships between church and state power, based on the political and ecclesiological ideas of Ephraem the Syrian. However, the origins of the story are still far from certain, although the stories as recorded seem to have been shaped by the controversies of the third century CE, especially as a response to Bardaisan.

See also
Doctrine of Addai

Notes

References

Sources 

  (German original published in 1934)

External links 
 Ante-Nicene Fathers, vol. VIII: Acts of the Holy Apostle Thaddeus, One of the Twelve
 Epistle of Jesus Christ to Abgarus King of Edessa from Eusebius
 St. Apkar Armenian Apostolic Church of Arizona
 Correspondence between Abgarus Ouchama, King of Edessa, and Jesus of Nazareth (J.Lorber, 1842)
 English translation of ancient documents on the conversion of Abgar, including relevant passages from Eusebius and the Doctrine of Addai are available in 

Syriac Orthodox Church saints
Osroene
1st-century BC births
1st-century Arabs
1st-century BC Arabs
50 deaths
1st-century Christian saints
Kings of Osroene
Converts to Christianity from pagan religions
Year of birth unknown
Christian royal saints
Saints of the Armenian Apostolic Church
Arab Christian saints
Legendary Arab people